Double Mountain is the highest point in the Tehachapi Mountains of California. It has two summits of nearly the same elevation. It is south of the town of Tehachapi, Highway 58 and Tehachapi Pass.
Due to its elevation, the mountain receives snowfall during the winter.

Natural history 
South of Double Mountain the Tehachapi Range has a large rounded crest, whose eastern flank is quite steep.
This crest is the southern terminus of the range of the hybrid Alvord oak, Quercus × alvordiana.

References

External links
 

Mountains of Kern County, California
Tehachapi Mountains
Mountains of Southern California